Audrey Kennedy (born 1978) is a camogie player and sports therapist. She won a Soaring Star award in 2009 and won a 2009 All Ireland junior camogie medal. Audrey has a total of seven Leinster medals in her collection – two with the county Junior team, one schools and four Junior club. Her brother, Brian Hennessy, won All-Ireland Minor and Senior hurling titles with Offaly.
Audrey is married to Irish Award Winning Singer & Songwriter Pete Kennedy (Peter Kennedy)

References

External links 
 Official Camogie Website
 Offaly Camogie website
 Review of 2009 championship in On The Ball Official Camogie Magazine
 Video Highlights of 2009 All Ireland Junior Final
 Report of Offaly v Waterford 2009 All Ireland junior final in Irish Times Independent, Examiner and Offaly Express.
 Video highlights of 2009 championship Part One and part two

1978 births
Living people
Offaly camogie players